David Victor Picker (May 14, 1931 – April 20, 2019) was an American motion picture executive and producer, working in the film industry for more than forty years. He served as president and chief executive officer for United Artists, Paramount, Lorimar, and Columbia Pictures before becoming an independent producer. Picker was a member of the Writers Guild of America East, a member the Producers Guild of America, and he was Chairman Emeritus of the Producers Guild of America East. Picker's memoir about his career in the film industry, Musts, Maybes and Nevers, was released in 2013.

Early life
Picker was born to a Jewish family on May 14, 1931, in New York City. He was the son of Sylvia (Moses) and Eugene Picker, a one-time president of Loew's Theatres and president of the National Association of Theatre Owners, executive of Trans-Lux and vice-president of United Artists. David attended Dartmouth College and graduated with a Bachelor of Arts degree in 1953.

Film career

1950s–1969
Picker began his movie career at United Artists in 1956, working in advertising and publicity. By 1961 he was an assistant to Arthur Krim, the president. Picker helped bring Tom Jones to United Artists in 1963. The film received four Academy Awards, including Best Picture and Best Director for Tony Richardson. In 1964 Picker accepted the award on behalf of Tony Richardson, who was not in attendance. By the late 1960s, Picker was managing United Artists Records.

1969–1973: United Artists Corporation
Picker became chief operating officer and president of United Artists Corporation in 1969. Having earlier brought the Beatles' A Hard Day's Night and Help! to the company, Picker was also responsible for a deal with producers Harry Saltzman and Albert Broccoli for the James Bond series which launched one of the most successful franchises in cinema history. Other notable releases during his time as president of United Artists included Midnight Cowboy and Last Tango in Paris.
Picker also established the company's lasting relationship with writer and director Woody Allen in addition to European filmmakers Federico Fellini, Ingmar Bergman, François Truffaut, Louis Malle, and Sergio Leone. He became CEO and president of UA on January 1, 1973.

1973–1993
In 1973, Picker left United Artists to form his own production company, Two Roads Productions, and produced Juggernaut and Lenny in 1974 and Smile in 1975. Lenny became a critical success and was nominated for six Academy Awards. 
In 1976 Picker then became President of Motion Pictures at Paramount but served for only a few years, during which he helped develop or greenlight Saturday Night Fever, Grease, and the 1980 Academy Award winner, Ordinary People.
Upon leaving Paramount in 1979, Picker partnered with comedian Steve Martin to produce that year's The Jerk, Dead Men Don't Wear Plaid in 1982, and The Man with Two Brains in 1983.
In the mid-1980s, Picker took over as President of Feature Films at Lorimar Productions, developing and supervising the films S.O.B., Being There, and Escape to Victory. Hired in 1985 by Columbia Pictures to serve as president of production, Picker greenlit Hope and Glory, School Daze, Vice Versa, Punchline, and True Believer. 
By the mid-1980s, Picker was independently producing again. In 1987, he had left the post of Columbia Pictures after David Puttnam had left the company and Dawn Steel and Roger Faxon joining the company. in order to revive Two Roads Productions with a non-exclusive production agreement with Columbia Pictures. He worked with Harry Belafonte to produce Beat Street and also produced a remake of Stella Dallas called Stella, starring Bette Midler.

1993 to 2000s
Picker produced The Saint of Fort Washington for Warner Bros. in 1993 and The Crucible for Twentieth Century Fox in 1996. In 1997, Picker became president of Hallmark Entertainment Productions Worldwide to oversee the company's objective of expanding into feature films.

From 2004 to 2008, Picker served as chairman of The Producers Guild of America for the East. Picker's memoir about his career in the film industry, Musts, Maybes and Nevers, was released in 2013.

Personal life and death
Picker was married three times. In 1954 he married Caryl Schlossman, with whom he had two daughters, Caryn and Pam. In 1975 he married casting director Nessa Hyams; he produced and she directed the feature film Leader of the Band in 1987. In 1995 Picker married photographer Sandra Jetton, who survived him. They lived in New York City.

Picker's sister is Jean Picker Firstenberg, past CEO and Director of the American Film Institute. His uncle, Arnold Picker, was also an executive vice-president at United Artists.

On April 20, 2019, Picker died in New York City from colon cancer at the age of 87. He was survived by his wife, Sandra, his two daughters and his sister.

Selected filmography
He was a producer in all films unless otherwise noted.

Film

Miscellaneous crew

Thanks

Television

Miscellaneous crew

References

External links
 

1931 births
2019 deaths
Businesspeople from New York City
American film studio executives
Paramount Pictures executives
20th-century American Jews
American chief operating officers
American memoirists
20th-century American businesspeople
21st-century American Jews
Presidents of Columbia Pictures